Adolf Liebscher (11 March 1857, in Prague – 11 June 1919, in Potštejn) was a Czech history painter.

Life and work
After completing his education in the local schools, he went to Vienna, where he attended a three-year course for drawing teachers under Ferdinand Laufberger. He then spent six months preparing to enter a competition for the creation of decorations in the foyer at the National Theater. He received the Second Prize, and his drawings were used for the lunettes. Afterwards, he spent several months in Italy.

Upon his return, he received a series of public commissions, including work at the Rudolfinum, the municipal union hall in Písek and the government office buildings in Vinohrady and Vyškov. He became a teacher at the Technical University in 1879, was promoted to Associate Professor in 1895 and was named a Professor in 1911.

In 1903, he exhibited a cycle of tempera paintings entitled "Czech Elegy", featuring an iconic portrait crowned with thorns, meant to symbolize the suffering of the Czech nation from the oppression of the Austro-Hungarian monarchy. That same year, he painted a portrait of Emperor Franz Joseph.

In addition to his historical scenes, he produced folk-costume studies, altarpieces and illustrations, many of which appeared in the magazines Zlatá Praha and Světozor. Together with his brother Karel (who was also an artist), he created a panoramic mural, "The Swedes on the Charles Bridge", for the Mirror Maze at Petřín.

References

Further reading

 Vilém Weitenweber, Adolf Liebscher, in "Zlatá Praha" (1885) Vol.5, No.19 pg.258 
 Z kulturního světa, in "Zlatá Praha" (1919), Vol.6, No.36 pg.334 
 Adolf Liebscher, in "Humoristické listy"  (1887), Vol.12, No.29 pg.436

External links

 ArtNet: More works by Liebscher

1857 births
1919 deaths
19th-century Czech painters
Czech male painters
20th-century Czech painters
Artists from Prague
Burials at Vyšehrad Cemetery
19th-century Czech male artists
20th-century Czech male artists